Anjani, born Anjani Thomas, is an American singer-songwriter.

Anjani may also refer to:

Hinduism
 Añjanā, (Anjani in Malay), the mother of Hanuman, one of the heroes of the Indian epic, the Ramayana

People
 Anjani Bai Malpekar (1883 – 1974), Indian classical singer
 Anjani Kumar Sharma (born 1933), Nepal's first general surgeon
 Anjani Thomas (born 1959), American singer-songwriter

Places
 Anjani Khurd, a village in Lonar taluka, Buldhana district, Maharashtra, India

See also
 Anjaana Anjaani
Antani